Helene Kreszenz Sedlmayr (12 February 1813, Trostberg – 18 November 1898,  Munich) was a German beauty of the 19th century, considered the epitome of Munich's beauties. A shoemaker's daughter, she became known to Ludwig I of Bavaria when (aged 15) she supplied toys to his children and he commissioned a portrait of her from Stieler for his Gallery of Beauties. 

In 1831 she married the king's valet Hermes Miller (1804–1871), with whom she had 10 children.

External links
 Article about Helene Sedlmayr

1813 births
1898 deaths
People from Munich
19th-century German people
Burials at the Alter Südfriedhof